Cluck Ranch Airport  is a privately owned, public use airport in Sherman County, Texas, United States. It is located 17 nautical miles (20 mi, 31 km) southwest of the central business district of Gruver, a city in Hansford County.

Facilities 
Cluck Ranch Airport covers an area of 116 acres (47 ha) at an elevation of 3,423 feet (1,043 m) above mean sea level. It has one runway designated 1/19 with an asphalt surface measuring 3,605 by 35 feet (1,099 × 11 m).

References

External links 
  at Texas DOT Airport Directory
 Aerial photo as of February 1996 from USGS The National Map via MSR Maps
 Aeronautical chart at SkyVector

Defunct airports in Texas
Airports in Texas
Transportation in Sherman County, Texas